The George Parsons Trophy is awarded annually to the player judged to be the most sportsmanlike at the Memorial Cup tournament. It was first awarded in 1974. The trophy is named for George Parsons, a former Ontario Hockey Association player whose career was ended prematurely in 1939, due to an eye injury in a National Hockey League game. Parsons appeared in the 1933 Memorial Cup as a member of the West Toronto Nationals, and the 1934 Memorial Cup as a member of the Toronto Young Rangers. Parsons later became involved with CCM hockey, helping to develop hockey helmets and facial protection for player safety, that were approved by the Canadian Standards Association and endorsed by the Canadian Amateur Hockey Association in 1976.

Winners
List of winners of the George Parsons Trophy.

See also
List of Canadian Hockey League awards

References

External links
 History – Awards – Mastercard Memorial Cup

Canadian Amateur Hockey Association trophies
Canadian Hockey League trophies and awards